The Eleven Members refers to members of the House of Commons of England, who were identified by commanders of the New Model Army as their principal opponents. They were suspended and forced into exile for six months; after the 1648 Second English Civil War, many were permanently removed in December 1648.

Background

Parliament's victory in the 1642 to 1646 First English Civil War intensified an internal political struggle over a settlement with Charles I. From 1643 on, Parliament was split into a 'Peace Party', led by Denzil Holles, who sought a negotiated end to the conflict. The 'War Party' argued there could be no negotiation until military victory, its best known member being Oliver Cromwell. 

Presbyterians were represented in both factions, including Sir Thomas Fairfax, commander of the New Model Army. The Peace Party were allies of the Scots Covenanters, who also wanted a negotiated settlement; they are called Presbyterian since they supported the 1643 Solemn League and Covenant, and its commitment to a unified, Presbyterian Church of Scotland and England. Negotiations over the terms were carried on by the 1643 to 1653 Westminster Assembly. 

They were opposed in Parliament by the so-called Independents, who opposed any state-mandated religion, and were heavily represented in the New Model Army. In addition, English Royalists and many who fought for Parliament were neither Presbyterian, nor Independent, but supporters of an Episcopalian Church of England. This makes it difficult to generalise on political and religious views.  

However, the Peace Party fundamentally misunderstood Charles; when Prince Rupert told him in August 1645 the war was lost, Charles responded he was correct, if seen from a military viewpoint, but 'God will not suffer rebels and traitors to prosper'. This deeply-held conviction meant he refused any substantial concessions. Aware of divisions among his opponents, he used his position as king of both Scotland and England to deepen them, assuming he was essential to any government.

By 1647, Parliament was struggling with the economic cost of the war, a poor 1646 harvest, and plague, while it had to suspend wages for the New Model to raise cash for the Scots. The Presbyterians had substantial support among the London Trained Bands, and by March 1647, they felt strong enough to order the New Model to Ireland. Only those who agreed would receive their arrears, and when regimental representatives, or Agitators, demanded full payment for all in advance, Parliament disbanded it. 

The New Model refused to be disbanded; in early June, the Army Council presented peace terms to Charles, which he rejected. Parliament protested at the creation of a separate, largely unelected power centre; in June 1647, the Army's supporters in Parliament demanded the impeachment of eleven members. After this was refused, Holles and the others withdrew, in order to prevent violence.

Members

Note

References

Sources

External links
 

 
English Civil War